Palustris is a Latin word meaning "swampy" or "marshy", and may refer to:

Animals
 Acrocephalus palustris, (marsh warbler) which breeds in temperate Europe and western Asia and winters mainly in south east Africa
 Aethiothemis palustris, a species of dragonfly in the family Libellulidae
 Agyneta palustris, a species of sheet weaver found in China
 Altica palustris, a species of flea beetle from a family of leaf beetles, that can be found in the Palearctic, including North Africa
 Boeckella palustris, a species of copepod that lives in South America
 Cephalotes palustris, a species of arboreal ant of the genus Cephalotes
 Chamaesphecia palustris, a moth of the family Sesiidae. It is found in many countries in Europe
 Cistothorus palustris, the marsh wren, a small songbird species found in North America
 Crocodylus palustris  the mugger crocodile, Indian, Indus, Persian or marsh crocodile, a reptile species found throughout the Indian subcontinent and the surrounding countries
 Eimeria palustris, an apicomplexan parasite species that infects the marsh rice rat
 Herina palustris, a species of picture-winged fly in the genus Herina of the family Ulidiidae
 Herpestes javanicus palustris, the Bengal mongoose, a subspecies of the Small Asian mongoose
 Hydroporus palustris, a species of ground beetle native to the Palearctic (including Europe) and the Near East
 Hypenodes palustris, a species of moth in the family Erebidae
 Kikimora palustris, a species of spiders in the family Linyphiidae
 Lithobates palustris, the pickerel frog (formerly Rana palustris) small North American frog
 Littoridinops palustris, a species of very small aquatic snail, an operculate gastropod mollusk in the family Hydrobiidae
 Mecyclothorax palustris, a species of ground beetle in the subfamily Psydrinae
 Methylocella palustris, a species of bacterium. It is notable for oxidising methane
 Notiophilus palustris, a species of ground beetle, native to the Palearctic and the Nearctic, also found In Europe
 Proceratophrys palustris, a species of frog in the family Odontophrynidae. It is endemic to Brazil
 Orthotylus palustris, a species of bug in the family Miridae that is can be found in Albania, Croatia, France, Greece, Italy, Slovenia, and Spain
 Oryzomys palustris, the marsh rice rat, a semiaquatic North American rodent
 Ortalis palustris, a species of ulidiid or picture-winged fly in the genus Ortalis of the family Ulidiidae
 Quiscalus palustris, the slender-billed grackle, a species of bird in the icterid family
 Radfordia palustris, a species of mite in the subgenus Hesperomyobia of the genus Radfordia
 Rhodopseudomonas palustris, a gram-negative purple non-sulfur bacteria, notable for its ability to switch between four different modes of metabolism
 Sorex palustris, a species of semi-aquatic shrew found in North America
 Sphaenorhynchus palustris, a frog species endemic to Brazil
 Stagnicola palustris, a species of air-breathing freshwater snail, an aquatic pulmonate gastropod mollusk in the family Lymnaeidae, the pond snails
 Sylvilagus palustris, the marsh rabbit, a mammal species found in marshes and swamps of coastal regions of the Eastern and Southern United States
 Terebralia palustris, common name the giant mangrove whelk, a species of brackish-water snail
 Tephrocybe palustris, a species of fungus in the family Lyophyllaceae which parasitizes sphagnum moss
 Trachelipus palustris a species of woodlouse in the genus Trachelipus from Greece

Plants
 Acacia palustris, a tree or shrub belonging to the genus Acacia and the subgenus Juliflorae
 Anacamptis palustris, a species of orchid
 Angelica palustris, also known as marsh angelica, a biennial or a perennial plant species from the family Apiaceae
 Brackenridgea palustris, a species of plant in the family Ochnaceae

 Calectasia palustris, blue tinsel lily or swamp tinsel lily from south-west of Western Australia
 Caltha palustris, marsh-marigold or kingcup, a plant species native to temperate regions of the Northern Hemisphere
 Chionanthus palustris, a tree from Borneo
 Claytonia palustris, a wildflower species in the purslane family known by the common names Jonesville springbeauty and marsh claytonia
 Coespeletia palustris, a wildflower native to the Andes
 Dirca palustris, or eastern leatherwood, is a shrub, native to the eastern half of North America but uncommon
 Eleocharis palustris, the common spike-rush, creeping spike-rush or marsh spike-rush, a plant species growing in wetlands throughout the Boreal Kingdom
 Epipactis palustris, the marsh helleborine, an orchid species
 Euphorbia palustris, (marsh spurge or marsh euphorbia) is a species of flowering plant, native to marshland of mainland Europe and western Asia
 Hottonia palustris, (the water violet or featherfoil) of the family Primulaceae is an aquatic plant
 Lathyrus palustris, a wild pea species known by the common name marsh pea, native to Europe, Asia, and North America.
 Ludwigia palustris, a flowering plant species in the evening primrose family known by the common names marsh seedbox and water purslane
 Pandanus palustris a species of plant in the family Pandanaceae. It is endemic to Mauritius
 Parnassia palustris, commonly called marsh grass of Parnassus, northern grass-of-Parnassus, or just grass-of-Parnassus and bog-star
 Persea palustris. a species of plant in the family Lauraceae
 Pinus palustris, the longleaf pine from USA
 Quercus palustris, the pin oak or swamp Spanish oak
 Rorippa palustris, a flowering plant species in the mustard family known by the common names bog yellowcress and marsh cress
 Rosa palustris, (swamp rose), a shrub in the rose family native to much of eastern North America
 Rumex palustris (marsh dock) is a plant species of the genus Rumex
 Sonchus palustris, (marsh sowthistle) is a plant native to temperate regions of the Europe, Russia, Central Asia, and western China
 Stachys palustris, the marsh woundwort, an edible perennial grassland herb species
 Stenochlaena palustris an edible medicinal fern species, used in the folk medicines of India and Malaysia
 Tabernaemontana palustris, a tropical flowering plant species in the family Apocynaceae from northern South America
 Terebralia palustris, the mangrove whelk, a species of brackish-water snail in the family Potamididae
 Thelypteris palustris, the marsh fern, native to eastern North America and across Eurasia.
 Triglochin palustris, marsh arrowgrass, a variety of arrowgrass found in damp grassland.
 Viola palustris, (marsh violet or alpine marsh violet) is a perennial from northern parts of North America and Eurasia.
 Zannichellia palustris, the horned pondweed, a plant found in fresh to brackish waters in the United States Europe, Asia, Australasia, and South America
 Zizania palustris, (Northern wild rice) an annual plant, native to the Great Lakes region of North America, the aquatic areas of the boreal forest regions of Northern Ontario, Alberta, Saskatchewan and Manitoba in Canada and Minnesota, Wisconsin, Michigan and Idaho in the US